Valérie Barlois-Mevel-Leroux  (born 28 May 1969) is a French fencer. She won a gold medal in the women's team épée and a silver in the individual épée at the 1996 Summer Olympics.

References

External links
 

1969 births
Living people
French female épée fencers
Olympic fencers of France
Fencers at the 1996 Summer Olympics
Fencers at the 2000 Summer Olympics
Olympic gold medalists for France
Olympic silver medalists for France
Olympic medalists in fencing
Sportspeople from Melun
Medalists at the 1996 Summer Olympics
20th-century French women
21st-century French women